Esteban Pablo De la Fuente (born November 18, 1968 in Buenos Aires) is a retired Argentine male professional basketball player. At a height of 1.97 meters (6'5¾") tall, and a weight of 105 kg (232 lbs.), he played at the shooting guard and small forward positions. His number 7 jersey was retired by Quilmes (MdP), in 2013.

Professional career
De la Fuente was a two time Argentine League Finals MVP, in 1994 and 1995.

National team career
De la Fuente represented the senior men's Argentine national basketball team at the 1996 Summer Olympic Games, in Atlanta, Georgia, where his team finished in ninth place in the overall-rankings. A year earlier he helped claim Argentina's first ever gold medal in senior men's Panamerican basketball, at the 1995 Pan American Games, after defeating the United States in the final, in Mar del Plata, Argentina.

References

1968 births
Living people
Argentine men's basketball players
1990 FIBA World Championship players
Basketball players at the 1995 Pan American Games
Basketball players at the 1996 Summer Olympics
Independiente de General Pico basketball players
Olympic basketball players of Argentina
Pan American Games gold medalists for Argentina
Pan American Games medalists in basketball
Peñarol de Mar del Plata basketball players
Shooting guards
Small forwards
Basketball players from Buenos Aires
1998 FIBA World Championship players
Medalists at the 1995 Pan American Games